The 2015 Junior World Weightlifting Championships were held in Hala Orbita, Wrocław, Poland from 6 to 13 June 2015.

Medal summary

Men

Women

Medal table
Ranking by Big (Total result) medals

Ranking by all medals: Big (Total result) and Small (Snatch and Clean & Jerk)

References

External links
Start Book
Results Book (Polski Związek Podnoszenia Ciężarów)
Results Book (International Weightlifting Federation)

IWF Junior World Weightlifting Championships
International weightlifting competitions hosted by Poland
2015 in weightlifting
2016 in Polish sport
Sport in Wrocław